Sucheta Dalal (born 1962) is an Indian business journalist and author. She has been a journalist for over two decades and was awarded a Padma Shri for journalism in 2006. 
She was the Financial Editor for the Times of India until 1998 when she joined the Indian Express group as a Consulting Editor, leaving in 2008. She is known for exposing the 1992 stock market scam propagated by Harshad Mehta.

In 2006, she began to write for Moneylife, a fortnightly magazine on investment started by her husband Debashis Basu. She is now the Managing Editor of Moneylife. In 2010, responding to poor financial literacy in India, she and her husband founded Moneylife Foundation, a not-for-profit organisation based in Mumbai. She is a member of the Investor Education & Protection Fund of the Ministry of Corporate Affairs. In 1992, she was honoured with the Chameli Devi Jain Award for Outstanding Women Mediapersons.

Education and career

Born in a Jat family, Sucheta did her schooling at St. Joseph’s Convent School, Belagavi. She then studied B.Sc Statistics at Karnataka College, Dharwad. She is a trained lawyer having gained LL.B and LL.M from Bombay University.  

Subsequently, in 1984, Sucheta began her career in journalism by landing a job with Fortune India, an investment magazine.  Later, she went on to work in news companies like Business Standard and The Economic Times. 
In the early 1990s, Dalal joined the prominent Mumbai based newspaper Times of India as a journalist for their Business and economics wing. There she investigated a number of cases that would eventually lead to her prominence in the fields of journalism and activism. These included the Harshad Mehta scam of 1992, the Enron scam, the Industrial Development Bank of India scam, the Ketan Parekh scam in 2001. She worked closely with journalists and analysts such as Debashis Basu, Girish Sant, Shantanu Dixit and Pradyumna Kaul. She later became the Financial editor of Times of India.

Awards and recognition
Sucheta has been conferred the Padma Shri Award, the Chameli Devi Award instituted by the Media Foundation, and Femina’s Woman of Substance Award for her zealous work in journalism. 

Scam 1992, a docudrama directed series by Hansal Mehta was based on her and Debasis Basu's book The Scam. It was released in October 2020 and Dalal's character was played by Shreya Dhanwanthary.

Select publications 

Books

In popular culture
 Actress Shreya Dhanwanthary played Sucheta Dalal in Scam 1992, a Sony LIV's original series. It was based on her own book The Scam: Who Won, Who Lost, who Got Away.
 Actress Ileana D'Cruz has played Meera Rao, a character inspired by Sucheta Dalal in The Big Bull, a 2021 film which is also based on the same book.

References

External links
Sucheta Dalal's blog

1962 births
Living people
Recipients of the Padma Shri in literature & education
University of Mumbai alumni
Indian business and financial journalists
Indian Express Limited people
Indian newspaper journalists
Journalists from Karnataka
People from Dharwad district
Indian investigative journalists
Managing editors
Karnatak University alumni